The 2019–20 UEFA Champions League group stage began on 17 September 2019 and ended on 11 December 2019. A total of 32 teams competed in the group stage to decide the 16 places in the knockout phase of the 2019–20 UEFA Champions League.

Draw
The draw for the group stage was held on 29 August 2019, 18:00 CEST, at the Grimaldi Forum in Monaco.

The 32 teams were drawn into eight groups of four, with the restriction that teams from the same association could not be drawn against each other. For the draw, the teams were seeded into four pots based on the following principles (Regulations Article 13.06):
Pot 1 contained the Champions League and Europa League title holders, and the champions of the top six associations based on their 2018 UEFA country coefficients. If one or both title holders were one of the champions of the top six associations, the champions of the next highest ranked association(s) were also seeded into Pot 1.
Pot 2, 3 and 4 contained the remaining teams, seeded based on their 2019 UEFA club coefficients.

On 17 July 2014, the UEFA emergency panel ruled that Ukrainian and Russian clubs would not be drawn against each other "until further notice" due to the political unrest between the countries.

Moreover, for associations with two or more teams, teams were paired in order to split them into two sets of four groups (A–D, E–H) for maximum television coverage. The following pairings were announced by UEFA after the group stage teams were confirmed:

Spain: Barcelona and Real Madrid, Atlético Madrid and Valencia
England: Liverpool and Manchester City, Chelsea and Tottenham Hotspur
Italy: Juventus and Inter Milan, Napoli and Atalanta
Germany: Bayern Munich and Borussia Dortmund, Bayer Leverkusen and RB Leipzig
France: Paris Saint-Germain and Lyon
Russia: Zenit Saint Petersburg and Lokomotiv Moscow
Belgium: Club Brugge and Genk

On each matchday, one set of four groups played their matches on Tuesday, while the other set of four groups played their matches on Wednesday, with the two sets of groups alternating between each matchday. The fixtures were decided after the draw, using a computer draw not shown to public, with the following match sequence (Regulations Article 16.02):

Note: Positions for scheduling do not use the seeding pots, e.g. Team 1 was not necessarily the team from Pot 1 in the draw.

There were scheduling restrictions: for example, teams from the same city (e.g. Real Madrid and Atlético Madrid) in general were not scheduled to play at home on the same matchday (to avoid them playing at home on the same day or on consecutive days, due to logistics and crowd control), and teams from "winter countries" (e.g. Russia) were not scheduled to play at home on the last matchday (due to cold weather).

The draw also established the group compositions of the UEFA Champions League Path of the 2019–20 UEFA Youth League.

Teams
Below are the participating teams (with their 2019 UEFA club coefficients), grouped by their seeding pot. They include:
26 teams which enter in this stage
6 winners of the play-off round (4 from Champions Path, 2 from League Path)

Notes

Format
In each group, teams play against each other home-and-away in a round-robin format. The group winners and runners-up advance to the round of 16, while the third-placed teams enter the Europa League round of 32.

Tiebreakers
Teams are ranked according to points (3 points for a win, 1 point for a draw, 0 points for a loss), and if tied on points, the following tiebreaking criteria are applied, in the order given, to determine the rankings (Regulations Articles 17.01):
Points in head-to-head matches among tied teams;
Goal difference in head-to-head matches among tied teams;
Goals scored in head-to-head matches among tied teams;
Away goals scored in head-to-head matches among tied teams;
If more than two teams are tied, and after applying all head-to-head criteria above, a subset of teams are still tied, all head-to-head criteria above are reapplied exclusively to this subset of teams;
Goal difference in all group matches;
Goals scored in all group matches;
Away goals scored in all group matches;
Wins in all group matches;
Away wins in all group matches;
Disciplinary points (red card = 3 points, yellow card = 1 point, expulsion for two yellow cards in one match = 3 points);
UEFA club coefficient.

Groups
The matchdays were 17–18 September, 1–2 October, 22–23 October, 5–6 November, 26–27 November, and 10–11 December 2019. The scheduled kickoff times were 21:00 CET/CEST, with two matches on each Tuesday and Wednesday scheduled for 18:55 CET/CEST.

Times are CET/CEST, as listed by UEFA (local times, if different, are in parentheses).

Group A

Group B

Group C

Group D

Group E

Group F

Group G

Group H

Notes

References

External links

Group Stage
2019-20
September 2019 sports events in Europe
October 2019 sports events in Europe
November 2019 sports events in Europe
December 2019 sports events in Europe